Sin Cowe Island , also known as Sinh Ton Island; Rurok Island; Mandarin , is an island in the Spratly Islands in the South China Sea. It has a fringing reef which is above water at low tide.

This island has been controlled by Vietnam since 1974, first by South Vietnam's ARVN Navy, followed by the Navy of the Socialist Republic of Vietnam after 1975. The island is also claimed by China, the Philippines and Taiwan.

It is part of the Union Banks.

Topography and Structures
Sin Cowe island is garrisoned by Vietnamese soldiers. The structures on it include a two-storied government building, anti aircraft guns, artillery and a Vietnamese Sovereignty marker.

There is also a civilian population with a school, children's playground, medical station and wind turbines for electricity generation.

See also
Spratly Islands dispute

References

External links

Maritime Transparency Initiative Island Tracker

Islands of the Spratly Islands
Union Banks